Bellocq is a commune of the Pyrénées-Atlantiques department in southwestern France.

Inhabitants of Bellocq are called Bellocquais.

Economy
The commune is part of the wine zone appellation d'origine contrôlée (AOC) du Béarn. Since 1991, the AOC Béarn-Bellocq applies to wines grown in the communes of Bellocq, Lahontan, Orthez and Salies-de-Béarn.

Bellocq is also part of the cheese producing zone d'appellation, l'Ossau-Iraty.

Sights
 The Château de Bellocq is a ruined castle dating partly from the 13th century.

Personalities
 Robert Cazala, born 1934 in Bellocq, former French cyclist.

See also
Communes of the Pyrénées-Atlantiques department

References

Communes of Pyrénées-Atlantiques
Pyrénées-Atlantiques communes articles needing translation from French Wikipedia